Dragan is a masculine given name.

Drăgan may also refer to:

Surname
 Christina Drăgan (born 2007), Romanian-American rhythmic gymnast
 Iosif Constantin Drăgan, Romanian and Italian businessman, writer and historian
 Ioan Drăgan (1965 – 2012), a Romanian footballer

Geography 

Rivers in Romania:
Drăgan (Crișul Repede), in Bihor and Cluj Counties
Drăgan, a tributary of the Florei in Prahova County

See also 
 Drăgoi (surname)
 Dragu (disambiguation)
 Drăganu (disambiguation)
 Drăgușeni (disambiguation)
 Drăgănești (disambiguation)
 Drăgănescu (disambiguation)
 Drăguș, a commune in Braşov County, Romania
 Drăgești, name of several villages in Romania
 Drăgoiești, name of several villages in Romania
 Dragosloveni (disambiguation), name of several villages in Romania

Romanian-language surnames